Madah-Sartre is a seven-act play by Alek Baylee Toumi, first published in French in 1996 and published in English in 2007. It depicts a fictional abduction by Islamists of Jean-Paul Sartre and Simone de Beauvoir in Algeria in 1993, and attempts by these Islamists to convert their captives to Islam.

Characters

Main characters
 Jean-Paul Sartre
 Simone de Beauvoir
 Madah (Islamist, leader of a group of Islamist thugs, drives a Rolls-Royce provided by Saudis)
 Chief Chador (Madah's female counterpart)

Secondary characters

 Cab driver Hamid Lounar
 Chadorettes (Chief Chador's female entourage)

Plot
It is 1993 in Algeria and Islamists have just assassinated Tahar Djaout. Jean-Paul Sartre (died 1980) and Simone de Beauvoir (died 1986) return to earth from the afterlife to attend Djaout's funeral. While they are en route to the funeral, Islamists abduct them. The Islamists hold their intellectual guests captive and begin sessions of trying to convert Sartre and de Beauvoir to Islam.

Themes
Madah-Sartre was inspired by Peter Weiss's play Marat/Sade (1963). The play includes characters who support intellectual freedom and who challenge ideas detrimental to human wellbeing with better ideas (rather than with violence). In the preface Toumi states, "In the case of the civil war in Algeria, the overwhelming majority of the assassinated people – journalists, intellectuals, school teachers, raped women – are Muslims. It means that: The victims are Muslims, while the killers, the assassins, the terrorists are Islamists... It is very important not to confuse the two and to learn to distinguish between victims and executioners. Madah-Sartre is not anti-Muslim; on the contrary, it defends Muslim victims and all Others who are victims of terrorism. That is why Madah-Sartre is, without a shadow of a doubt, antifundamentalist, antiterrorist, and anti-Islamist."

Notes

References
 
 
 
 
 

Biographical plays about philosophers
Plays based on real people
Fiction set in 1993
Algeria in fiction
Algerian literature
2007 plays
Islam in fiction
Works about Jean-Paul Sartre
Cultural depictions of Jean-Paul Sartre
Cultural depictions of Simone de Beauvoir
Kidnapping in fiction
Plays set in Africa